Ruch Wysokie Mazowieckie is a Polish football club playing currently in III liga, group I.

References

External links
 Official Website
 Ruch Wysokie Mazowieckie at 90minut.pl

 
Association football clubs established in 1955
1955 establishments in Poland